Richard Henry Bowlas Summers (30 July 1860 – 22 December 1941) was a Welsh rugby union fullback who played club rugby for Haverfordwest and international rugby for Wales. Summers was a member of the very first Wales international team, that faced England in 1881.

Rugby career
Summers first played rugby for Cowbridge Grammar School as a schoolboy, but in May 1879 he left Cowbridge for a place at Cheltenham College, which he also represented.  In July 1880 he left Cheltenham and returned to his home town of Haverfordwest where he turned out for local club Haverfordwest RFC. When Richard Mullock began looking for players to represent the first Wales international rugby team, Summers fitted the profile of an educated gentleman from a club representing one of the outer reaches of the Welsh rugby map. It is believed that Summers came to the attention of Mullock as both Cowbridge Grammar and Cheltenham College were on the same fixture list as Cardiff, whose players Mullock was in contact with.   
 
Summers was played at fullback along with Newport's Charlie Newman, while the team was captained by Australian James Bevan. The international game was a disaster for Wales; the team had never played together before, and many were out of position; but even with these problems the match was far too easy a victory for the English. After losing by eight goals and six tries to nil the national press was angry at what was seen as a humiliation to the country. Summers was never chosen to represent his country again, and not long afterwards he emigrated to India.

Although Summers gave Haverfordwest their first international player in Wales' first game, it took the club almost one hundred years to produce another Welsh cap, when Peter Morgan was selected in 1980.

International matches played
Wales (rugby union)
  1881

Bibliography

References 

1860 births
1941 deaths
People educated at Cheltenham College
Rugby union fullbacks
Rugby union players from Haverfordwest
Wales international rugby union players
Welsh rugby union players